The 2014  Tour Cycliste Féminin International de l'Ardèche was a women's cycle stage race held in France  from 2 September to 7 September, 2014. The tour has an UCI rating of 2.2.

Teams
The following teams participated:
UCI Women's Teams

 Astana BePink
 Estado de México–Faren Kuota
 Lointek
 Poitou–Charentes.Futuroscope.86
 RusVelo
 Servetto Footon
 Optum Kelly Benefit Strategies
 Top Girls Fassa Bortolo
 Wiggle–Honda

National teams

 Australia
 Denmark
 France
 Lithuania
 Norway
 Russia
 Switzerland

 Club teams

 Boretti Ladies (Netherlands)
 Maxx–Solar (Germany)
 Racing Students + Stevens Hytera (Germany)
 TKK Pacific Toruń (Poland)

 Mixed teams

 Mixed team 1
 Mixed team 2

Stages

Stage 1 
2 September La Voulte to Beauchastel

Stage 2 (ITT)
3 September Valvignères to Alba-la-Romaine

Stage 3
3 September Alba-la-Romaine to Le Teil

Stage 4
4 September Le Pouzin to Cruas

Stage 5
5 September St. Sauveur de Montagut to Villeneuve-de-Berg

Stage 6
6 September Grignan to Rochegude

Stage 7
7 September Grotte de Saint-Martin-d'Ardèche to Bourg-St-Andéol

Classification leadership

References

External links

Results from Pro Finish Service

International cycle races hosted by France
2014 in women's road cycling
Wikipedia articles in need of updating from September 2014
2014 in French sport